Lawrence Kalter Roos (February 1, 1918 – September 23, 2005) was an American banker and Republican from Missouri, United States.

Early life
Lawrence K. Roos was born in St. Louis, Missouri on February 1, 1918.  He attended Yale University, graduating in 1940, and served in the United States Army from 1941 to 1945.  In the army, he served in the European Theatre, rising to the rank of major; he was awarded with a bronze star and five battle stars.  After World War II, he worked in St. Louis for an advertising and public relations firm.

Public career
Lawrence K. Roos was first elected to public office in 1946, serving two terms (1947-1951) in the Missouri House of Representatives.

After several years out of politics, he was elected as St. Louis County Supervisor (now known as "St. Louis County Executive") in 1962.  He would remain as county executive for three terms (1963-1975).  While serving as county executive, he was the Republican nominee for Governor of Missouri in 1968.  Although he won the Republican primary easily, he lost the general election to incumbent governor, Warren E. Hearnes by a margin of 61-39%.

Following his three terms as county executive, Lawrence Roos was appointed first as vice president of the Federal Reserve Bank of St. Louis, and then on March 5, 1976, President of the Bank.  He would serve as President of the Bank from March 1976 to January 31, 1983.

Legacy
Lawrence Roos died from stomach cancer in Barnes-Jewish Hospital in St. Louis on September 23, 2005 at the age of 87.  The St. Louis County administrative office building in Clayton was named the Lawrence K. Roos Government Building in his honor.

References

External links
Statements and Speeches of Lawrence K. Roos

1918 births
2005 deaths
20th-century American politicians
United States Army personnel of World War II
County executives of St. Louis County, Missouri
Deaths from cancer in Missouri
Deaths from stomach cancer
Federal Reserve Bank of St. Louis presidents
Republican Party members of the Missouri House of Representatives
United States Army officers